A tlacoyo  is an oval-shaped Mexican dish of pre-Hispanic origin made of masa. Tlacoyos are thicker than fresh corn tortillas and are stuffed with cheese, fava beans, cooked ground beans, chicharron, and other ingredients before being fried or toasted. Tlacoyos can be served as an accompaniment to soups and stews or as appetizers for celebrations. 

Most traditional tlacoyos do not have lard or salt in the masa, and if not eaten soon after they are cooked, they become very tough and dry, even if reheated. In Mexican markets, vendors keep their tlacoyos warm by putting them in a covered basket, with the additional effect that the steam keeps them moist for a longer time.

Etymology 
The word tlacoyo derives from the Nahuatl word tlahtlaōyoh ), a name given to an antojito ('snack' or appetizer) typical of central Mexico. Spelling variations include tlayoyis, clacoyos, tlatloyos, tlayoyos and tlaoyos.

Variations 
Since it is similar in shape to a huarache (but smaller), and is made of the same corn as the sope and is even thicker (so it has more resistance to wet toppings), Mexican street vendors, especially in Mexico City, sometimes sell it with toppings on it, as an alternative to the sopes and huaraches. However, the traditional tlacoyo is supposed to be consumed without any toppings on it except for fresh salsa. This is the form in which they are typically found in the streets. 

Tlacoyos come in three different colors, although no artificial colors are added to its preparation. The color comes from the cornmeal used to prepare the masa which the tlacoyo is made with. The most common is blue masa, made from blue corn kernels.

See also
Huarache
Sope
 List of Mexican dishes

References

Maize dishes
Mexican cuisine
Pancakes